Bogdan Suchodolski (27 December 1903 – 2 October 1992) was a Polish philosopher, historian of science and culture and teacher. He served as a senior marshal of the Sejm from 1985 to 1989.

Biography
Bogdan Suchodolski was born in Sosnowiec, Poland, on 27 December 1903. He was a professor at the University of Lviv in 1938 and at the University of Warsaw from 1946 to 1970. He was also university director of the Institute of Pedagogical Sciences 1958–68.

He was a member of the Polish Academy of Learning (PAU) since 1946, and later the Polish Academy of Sciences (PAN). From 1965 to 1970, he worked as deputy secretary of PAN, and from 1958 to 1974, he was chairman of the Academy of Pedagogical Sciences.

On 20 December 1982 Suchodolski was appointed chairman of the National Council of Culture, and from 1985 to 1989 he served as senior marshall in Sejm.

He received an honorary degree from the University of Berlin, Lomonosov Moscow State University, University of Padova, the Academy of Pedagogical Sciences in E Pedagogical University of Opole and Silesian University.

Suchodolski authored papers dealing with education, history of Polish science and philosophy. He died in Konstancin-Jeziorna on 2 October 1992.

Bibliography
 Wychowanie moralno-społeczne (1936)
 Uspołecznienie kultury (1937)
 Skąd i dokąd idziemy? Przewodnik po zagadnieniach kultury współczesnej (1943/1999), pierwsze wydanie pod pseudonimem R. Jadźwing.
 Wychowanie dla przyszłości (1947/1968)
 O pedagogikę na miarę naszych czasów (1958)
 Narodziny nowożytnej filozofii człowieka (1963)
 Rozwój nowożytnej filozofii człowieka (1967)
 Trzy pedagogiki (1970)
 Komisja Edukacji Narodowej (1972)
 Problemy wychowania w cywilizacji współczesnej (1974)
 Komeński (1979)
 Kim jest człowiek? (1985)
 Wychowanie mimo wszystko (1990)

References

External links
 .

1903 births
1992 deaths
Academic staff of the University of Lviv
Academic staff of the University of Warsaw
20th-century Polish philosophers
Polish male writers
Recipients of the State Award Badge (Poland)